Scottsville may refer to several places in the United States of America:
Scottsville, California
Scottsville, Indiana
Scottsville, Kansas
Scottsville, Kentucky
Scottsville, New York
Scottsville, Texas
Scottsville, Virginia

See also:
Scottville (disambiguation)